Pamela Constable is a reporter and editor at the Washington Post. She has specialized in coverage of Afghanistan and Pakistan.

Constable attended Brown University.  Her first paid job in journalism began in 1974 at The Capital in Annapolis, Maryland. In the 1980s she was a correspondent for the Baltimore Sun and then the Boston Globe, covering Latin American affairs.

Constable was the Washington Posts bureau chief in Afghanistan and Pakistan in 2019 and previously served as the Posts South Asia bureau chief between 1999 and 2005.

She is the author of two books about South Asia and the U.S. intervention there, Fragments of Grace: My Search for Meaning in the Strife of South Asia (2004) and Playing with Fire: Pakistan at War with Itself (2011), as well as the 1991 political history A Nation of Enemies: Chile Under Pinochet with Arturo Valenzuela.

Personal life
Constable has practiced animal rescue on her foreign assignments, including a donkey and several dogs. Her father-in-law was the bishop of the Methodist Church of Chile.

References

External links

American newspaper journalists
American women journalists
20th-century American women writers
Brown University alumni
Living people
Year of birth missing (living people)
20th-century American non-fiction writers
The Washington Post journalists
21st-century American women